Kuriachira is a town in Kerala, India. It is located within 2 km south of Swaraj Round. It lies beside the Thalore bypass road. Kuriachira is 25th division of Thrissur Municipal Corporation. It is an important residential area of Thrissur city of Kerala state of India. Renowned Malayalam writer and feminist Sara Joseph was born here. Award-winning novel "Aalahayude Penmakkal" by Sara Joseph gives insight into the life, taste, history, people and linguatone of Kuriachira.

Education
 St. Joseph's Model Higher Secondary School  
 St.Paul's Convent English Higher Secondary School
 Pope John Primary School
 Mar Thimotheus Higher Secondary School 
 St.Joseph's Teacher Training Institute. 
 Several Kindergartens.
 St.Paul's Public School (Affiliated to CBSE), Kuriachira

References

 https://web.archive.org/web/20090712014446/http://www.corporationofthrissur.org/pages/Maintemp.asp?id=3

Suburbs of Thrissur city